The Imperial-Royal Landwehr ( or k.k. Landwehr), also called the Austrian Landwehr, was the territorial army of the Cisleithanian or Austrian half of the Austro-Hungarian Empire from 1869 to 1918. Its counterpart was the Royal Hungarian Landwehr (k.u. Landwehr). The two Landwehrs, together with the Common Army and the Imperial and Royal Navy, made up the armed forces (Bewaffnete Macht or Wehrmacht) of Austria-Hungary. While the name, "Imperial-Royal", might seem to suggest a link between the "Imperial" (Cisleithanian) and "Royal" (Transleithanian or Hungarian) halves of the Empire, in this context "Royal" actually refers to the Kingdom of Bohemia (Königreich Böhmen or České království) - not a sovereign kingdom on par with the Kingdom of Hungary, but a crownland of Cisleithanian Austria-Hungary and possession of the Habsburgs, who remained formally entitled to kingship. In this sense, the Kingdom of Bohemia was comparable in status to the Kingdom of Galicia and Lodomeria and the Kingdom of Dalmatia.

Unlike the German Empire, where the Landwehr mainly comprised reservists and volunteers, the Imperial-Royal Landwehr consisted of regular units. It was fully established with regular troops and not partly mobilized or cadred. The Landwehr should not be confused with the Landsturm which was a volunteer militia.

History 

The roots of the Landwehr go back to the 16th century when there were calls on all able-bodied men to defend their country.

During the Napoleonic Wars a Landwehr was established by imperial decree dated 9 June 1808 as a standing and common institution to complement the regular Austrian army. This army was used in 1809 and in 1813/14. In 1859, the Landwehr was abolished.

After the Austrian Empire had lost the war against Prussia, the Austro-Hungarian Compromise put an end of the absolutist rule over Hungary and established the Dual Monarchy. Hungary now wanted its own forces under command of the Hungarian government alongside the existing Imperial and Royal Army and Navy, which were commanded by the Emperor and Austro-Hungarian Minister of War. So the Compromise included the right of Hungary to establish the Royal Hungarian Landwehr (Magyar Királyi Honvédség), often colloquially known as the Honved or Honvéd (Honvédség).

As a consequence, the Cisleithanian counterpart of the Honved, known as the Imperial-Royal Landwehr, was established in the "kingdoms and lands represented in the Reichsrat", i.e. the remaining Empire of Austria. Its tasks were finally confirmed in 1889 in the Austrian Defence Act (RGBl. 41/1889) as follows:

§ 4. The Landwehr is tasked in time of war to support the Army and to defend the homeland; in peacetime, and by exception, also to maintain law and order and security of the homeland.

In § 14 Wehrgesetz 1889 the annual recruiting quota for the Landwehr was set at 10,000 men.

Conscription in the Landwehr was from age 21 up to 32 and included two or three years on active duty. The one-year volunteer served just one year, but received no wages and had to pay for their own equipment. After age 32, conscripted Landwehr soldiers were transferred to the Landsturm militia. As there were more conscripts available than were needed, a lot decided who was assigned to the army, who to the militia and who to the reserve.

The monarch became the supreme warlord, holding all authority over the structure, organization, and administration of the army. He appointed the senior officials, had the right to declare war, and was the commander-in-chief of the army.

The Landwehr's "March No. 1", which Beethoven composed in 1808, as the "March of the Bohemian Landwehr" (Marsch der böhmischen Landwehr), is known nowadays as the Yorck March (Yorckscher Marsch). As an element of the Grand Tattoo, performed e.g. by the Bundeswehr, it is now one of the best known German military marches.

Colours 
The Imperial-Royal Landwehr initially had no colours. However, in September 1915, Emperor Franz Joseph I granted the authority for the "M 1915" colours in recognition of "exceptionally meritorious achievements" by the Imperial Landwehr, which was then manufactured under the supervision of the Army Museum in 1916. These were to be handed over to the various regiments after the war. The process was regulated by the ordinances of the Imperial-Royal Landwehr, Standard Regulations, Part 22, dated 8 September 1915, in which the procedure for the award of colours was laid down by Special Order (Zirkularverordnung) 4 Sep 1915, Presentation No. 14,256. For this, the following letter was issued:

"His Imperial and Royal Apostolic Majesty, in gracious recognition of late of the exceptionally meritorious achievements by the Imperial Royal Landwehr, which fought throughout the recent war alongside troops of the Imperial and Royal Army, demonstrating stalwart and faithful discharge of duty before the enemy, and repeatedly earning the very highest tribute, graciously condescends to permit the Imperial Royal Landwehr troops to bear colours. In view of the design and material requirements of these colours, as well as their production and ceremonial presentation, they will only be available after the end of the war. This very highest act of grace is intended to spur the troops of the Imperial Royal Landwehr further to new deeds of heroism and, of course by further brilliant performance against the enemy, will prove they are worthy, time and again, of this most high honour!"

Freiherr von Georgi m.p.
General of Infantry

The colours were not issued during the period of the monarchy, but only later to traditional units. How many of these colours were made is not known. Records  show that at least the colours of the 2nd Linz Landwehr Infantry Regiment were transferred to the Kameradschaftsbund ehemaliger Zweierschützen ("2nd Rifles Old Comrades Association") in Linz on 8 June 1924. Also the existence of the colours of the 1st Vienna Imperial Royal Landwehr Infantry Regiment are known to have existed.

Structure 
The Austrian Landwehr reported to the Imperial-Royal Ministry of Defence (likewise the Hungarian Honvéd reported to the Royal Hungarian Ministry of Defence - both independent of the joint Ministry of War).

The k.k. State Ministry of Defence was located in Vienna at Babenbergerstraße 5. The Landwehr high command was housed on the first floor of the former Imperial Department of Justice at Schillerplatz 4. Landwehr staffs and the Landwehr Base Command were quartered in private homes. During the First World War, the k.k. Ministry of Defence was responsible under the War Office for homeland defence.

The Landwehr had its own barracks, depots and officer training establishments. The training of Landwehr officers took place in the Imperial-Royal Franz Joseph Military Academy in Boerhaavegasse in Vienna, one of five military academies in Austria-Hungary. In addition, there was a military upper school in Vienna and a military lower school in Bruck an der Leitha.

The Landwehr barracks in Vienna were the Kaiserebersdorf Landwehr Artillery Barracks, the Emperor Franz Josef Landwehr Barracks and Siebenbrunnengasse Landwehr Barracks. Next to the last-named barracks was the Landwehr Equipment Depot. The Imperial-Royal Landwehr Arms Depot was the Arsenal in Vienna.

The Imperial-Royal Landwehr (k.k. or kaiserlich österreichisch/königlich böhmisch) was the standing army of Austria responsible for the defence of Austria itself. Its order of battle at the outbreak of the First World War was as follows:
 37 infantry regiments -  each of 3 battalions (4th with 5 bns, 23rd with 2 bns, and 27th with 4 bns)
 6 regiments of lancers (uhlans)
 8 field artillery battalions (Feldkanonen-Divisionen) 
 8 field howitzer battalions (Feldhaubitz-Divisionen)

The mountain infantry had the following units:
 2 mountain infantry regiments, the 4th and 27th
 4 Tyrolian rifle regiments (Tiroler Landesschützen Regimenter) (1st, 2nd and 4th with three battalions and the 3rd with 4 battalions)  - from January 1917 named "imperial rifles" (Kaiserschützen)
 1 mounted Tyrolian rifle battalion (Reitende Tiroler Landesschützen)
 1 mounted Dalmatian rifle battalion (Reitende Dalmatiner Landesschützen)

Although the Landwehr infantry regiments were weaker in personnel than Imperial and Royal Infantry regiments (Landwehr regiments had just three battalions instead of the usual four in the Common Army - exceptions were the 1st and 3rd State Rifle Regiments who also had four battalions), they were often superior in terms of equipment. The parliaments of Cisleithania and Transleithania were rather more willing, to support "their" troops with financial resources than the common army.

A special feature was the title of the Landwehr regiments, which bore the name of the garrison location of their regimental staff (e.g. 6th Eger Landwehr Infantry Regiment - k. k. Landwehr-Infanterie-Regiment „Eger“ Nr. 6). The same was true of the state's rifle units, which also belonged to the Landwehr (3rd Innichen State Rifle Regiment - k.k. Landesschützen-Regiment „Innichen“ Nr. III). In this way, the closeness of each regiment with its garrison was emphasized.

Infantry 
On 11 April 1917 the infantry units of the Landwehr were renamed. The title "Landwehr" was replaced by "Schützen" ("Rifles"). The changes were as follows:

Landwehr Infantry Division (Landwehr Infanterietruppen Division) = Imperial-Royal Rifle Division (k.k. Schützendivision) 
Landwehr Infantry Brigade (Landwehrinfanteriebrigade) = Imperial-Royal Rifle Brigade (k.k. Schützenbrigade)
5th (Pola) Imperial-Royal Landwehr Infantry Regiment (k.k. Landwehr Infanterie Regiment „Pola“ Nr. 5) = 5th (Pola) Imperial-Royal Rifle Regiment (k.k. Schützenregiment „Pola“ Nr. 5)

Landwehr Infantry Divisions

Landwehr infantry regiments 

The infantry regiment consisted of only three battalions instead of the usual four found in the Common Army.
The garrison name is always the location of regimental HQ.
 1st Imperial-Royal Landwehr Infantry Regiment (Vienna)
25th Landwehr Infantry Brigade – 13th Landwehr Infantry Division – II Army Corps
Established: 1889: Garrison: Vienna  (Staff- XIII District HütteldorferStr. 188), 
Nationalities: 95 % German – 5 % other
Landwehr Recruiting District: Vienna A
Commanding Officer: Colonel Alexander Dini
Staff officers: Lieut. Colonel Gustav Urbanek - Lieut. Colonel Karl Schubert - Major Friedrich Bitterlich - Major Franz Heillinger - Major Karl Edler von Ruckmich - Major Julius Hoppe

 2nd Imperial-Royal Landwehr Infantry Regiment (Linz)
87th Landwehr Infantry Brigade – 44th Landwehr Infantry Division – XIV Army Corps
Established: 1889: Garrison: Linz
Nationalities: 98 % germans – 2 % other
Landwehr Recruiting District: Linz and Salzburg
Commander: Colonel Konstantin Ritter Wasserthal von Zuccari
Staff officers: Lieutenant Colonel Franz Unger - Lieutenant Colonel Anton Möstl - Major Josef Morel - Major Leopold Hirsch - Major Julius Vogel - Major Vinzenz Beran - Major Franz Drtina

 3rd Imperial-Royal Landwehr Infantry Regiment (Graz)
43rd Landwehr Infantry Brigade – 22nd Landwehr Infantry Division – III Army Corps
Established: 1889: Garrison: Graz - II Baon Leoben
Nationalities: 94 % German – 6 % other
Landwehr Recruiting District: Graz and Marburg -
Commanding Officer: Colonel Franz Flach
Staff officers: Lieut. Colonel Friedrich Hadler - Lieut. Colonel Friedrich Teppner - Major Maximilian Kispert - Josef Karpellus - Major Friedrich Ritter von Wohlrab - Major August Strasser

 4th Imperial-Royal Landwehr Infantry Regiment (Klagenfurt)
44th Landwehr Infantry Brigade – 22nd Landwehr Infantry Division – III Army Corps
Established: 1889: Garrison: Klagenfurt - II and III Baon Hermagor
Nationalities: 79 % German – 21 % other
Landwehr Recruiting District: Klagenfurt
Commanding Officer: Colonel Friedrich Eckhardt von Eckhardtsburg
Staff officers: Lieut. Colonel Karl Brunner - Lieut. Colonel Alois Edler von Fritsch - Major Eduard Alpi - Major Desiderius Deniflée - Major Robert Salomon - Major Emil Raabl von Hauenfreienstein
The 4th Infantry belonged to the Imperial-Royal Mountain Corps. From 11 April 1917 it was called the 1st Imperial-Royal Mountain Rifle Regiment 
Contrary to Landwehr dress regulations it wore uniform based on the pattern of the State Rifles with an edelweiss on the collar, but with a number 4 above the hunting horn on their caps instead of the Tyrolean eagle.

 5th Imperial-Royal Landwehr Infantry Regiment (Pola)
Guard force for Pola
Established: 1889: Garrison: Pola
Nationalities: 45 % Slovene – 22 % Serbian/Croatian – 20 % Italian – 8 % other
Landwehr Recruiting District: Triest
Commanding Officer: Colonel Richard Keki
Staff officers: Lieut. Colonel Eugen Vučinić - Lieut. Colonel Bernhard Zahn - Lieut. Colonel Georg Mitrović - Lieut. Colonel Heinrich Mandolfo - Major Edmund Lazar - Major Peter Franičević - Major Emil Ritter von Fischer

 6th Imperial-Royal Landwehr Infantry Regiment (Eger)
41st Landwehr Infantry Brigade – 21st Landwehr Infantry Division – VIII Army Corps
Established: 1889: Garrison: Eger
Nationalities: 97 % germans – 3 % other
Landwehr Recruiting District: Eger, Beraun
Commanding Officer: Colonel Adolf Hansmann 
Staff officers: Colonel Viktor Friedel - Lieut. Colonel Ludwig Dierkes - Lieut. Colonel Eduard Edler von Adamek - Major Richard Klär - Major Simon Ronacher - Major Leopold Schnabl

 7th Imperial-Royal Landwehr Infantry Regiment (Pilsen)
41st Landwehr Infantry Brigade – 21st Landwehr Infantry Division – VIII Army Corps
Established: 1889: Garrison: Pilsen - III Baon in Rokycany
Nationalities: 60 % Czech – 30 % German – 10 % other
Landwehr Recruiting District: Pilsen and Beraun
Commanding Officer: Colonel Franz Sappe
Staff officers: Lieut. Colonel Leo Pflug . Lieut. Colonel Johann Weber - Lieut. Colonel Adam Brun - Major Wilhelm Baumgartner - Major Eduard Scheiber - Major Wilhelm Mayer-Koffler - Major Karl Fischer

 8th Imperial-Royal Landwehr Infantry Regiment (Prague)
42nd Landwehr Infantry Brigade – 21st Landwehr Infantry Division – VIII Army Corps
Established: 1889: Garrison: Prague
Nationalities: 95 % Czech – 5 % other
Landwehr Recruiting District: Prague and Beraun
Commanding Officer: Colonel Albert Welley
Staff officers: Lieut. Colonel Wilhelm Pulz - Lieut. Colonel Josef Trink - Major Franz Wolf - Major Franz Štěpánek - Major Jakob Zdeněk - Major Klaudius Ritter Schoen von Liebingen - Major Johann Nachtmann - Major Julius Biborosch

 9th Imperial-Royal Landwehr Infantry Regiment (Leitmeritz)
52nd Landwehr Infantry Brigade – 26th Landwehr Infantry Division – IX Army Corps
Established: 1889: Garrison: Leitmeritz - III Baon in Komotau
Nationalities: 86 % German – 14 % other
Landwehr Recruiting District: Leitmeritz and Komotau
Commanding Officer: Colonel Josef Ritter Reyl-Hanisch von Greiffenthal
Staff officers: Colonel Karl Edler von Maschke - Lieut. Colonel Franz Schmidt - Lieut. Colonel Franz Knirsch - Major Erwin Preuss - Major Franz Gasser - Major Leo Stangl

 10th Imperial-Royal Landwehr Infantry Regiment (Jungbunzlau)
52nd Landwehr Infantry Brigade – 26th Landwehr Infantry Division – IX Army Corps
Established: 1889: Garrison: Jungbunzlau - III Baon in Turnau
Nationalities: 95 % Czech – 5 % other
Landwehr Recruiting District: Jungbunzlau and Turnau
Commanding Officer: Viktor Meisel
Staff officers: Lieut. Colonel Franz Wanke - Lieut. Colonel Karl Bubnik - Major Moritz von Frank - Major Johann Preiss

 11th Imperial-Royal Landwehr Infantry Regiment (Jičin)
51st Landwehr Infantry Brigade – 26th Landwehr Infantry Division – IX Army Corps
Established: 1889: Garrison: Jičín - III Baon in Jaroměř
Nationalities: 63 % Czech – 36 % German – 1 % other
Landwehr Recruiting District: Jičin and Königgrätz
Commanding Officer: Colonel Emil Stangl
Staff officers: Colonel Ignaz Bezděk - Lieut. Colonel Josef Basler - Lieut. Colonel Karl Petzold - Lieut. Colonel Franz Rutta - Lieut. Colonel Edgar Gautsch von Frankenborn - Major Rudolf Hug

 12th Imperial-Royal Landwehr Infantry Regiment (Časlau)
51st Landwehr Infantry Brigade – 26th Landwehr Infantry Division – IX Army Corps
Established: 1889: Garrison: Časlau
Nationalities: 87 % Czech – 13 % other
Landwehr Recruiting District: Časlau and Jungbunzlau
Commanding Officer: Colonel Oskar Esch
Staff officers: Lieut. Colonel Emil Pohl - Lieut. Colonel Josef Dokoupil - Major Franz Großauer - Majoer Franz Weinbacher - Major Hermann Jellinek

 13th Imperial-Royal Landwehr Infantry Regiment (Olmütz)
92nd Landwehr Infantry Brigade – 46th Landwehr Infantry Division – I Army Corps
Established: 1889: Garrison: Olmütz - III Baon in Mährisch-Schönberg
Nationalities: 64 % Czech – 31 % German – 5 % other
Landwehr Recruiting District: Olmütz and Mährisch Schönberg
Commanding Officer: Colonel Emil Wank
Staff officers: Lieut. Colonel Josef Baranowski - Lieut. Colonel Franz Lindner - Lieut. Colonel Friedrich Ritter von Stępski - Major Gustav Illić - Major Julius Kuczera - Major August Ritter von Panzera - Major Adolf Buchsbaum

 14th Imperial-Royal Landwehr Infantry Regiment (Brünn)
26th Landwehr Infantry Brigade – 13th Landwehr Infantry Division – II Army Corps
Established: 1889: Garrison: Brünn- II Baon in Iglau
Nationalities: 67 % Czech – 31 % German – 2 % other
Landwehr Recruiting District: Brünn and Iglau
Commanding Officer: Colonel Gustav Ritter von Zygadłowicz
Staff officers: Lieut. Colonel I Generalstabskorps Karl Stutz - Lieut. Colonel Oskar Waßhuber - Lieut. Colonel Eduard Rott - Major Rudolf Steinbrecher - Major Franz Tippelt

 15th Imperial-Royal Landwehr Infantry Regiment (Troppau)
92nd Landwehr Infantry Brigade – 46th Landwehr Infantry Division – I Army Corps
Established: 1889: Garrison: Troppau - III Baon in Mährisch-Weißkirchen
Nationalities: 82 % German – 18 % other
Landwehr Recruiting District: Troppau and Olmütz
Commanding Officer: Colonel Emil Pattay Edler von Ključ
Staff officers: Oberstlr. Konrad Pikolka - Major Theodor Piekhart - Major Emil Pohlenz - Major Johann Mohelský

 16th Imperial-Royal Landwehr Infantry Regiment (Krakau)
91st Landwehr Infantry Brigade – 46th Landwehr Infantry Division – I Army Corps
Established: 1889: Garrison: Krakow
Nationalities: 82 % Polish – 18 % other
Landwehr Recruiting District: Krakow and Wadowice
Commanding Officer: Colonel Heinrich Freiherr von Dürfeld
Staff officers: Lieut. Colonel Ludwig Zawada - Lieut. Colonel Ludwig Freisinger - Lieut. Colonel Karl Prettner - Major Alexander Edler von Karchesy - Major Adolf Meindl - Major Eduar Müller

 17th Imperial-Royal Landwehr Infantry Regiment (Rzeszów)
90th Landwehr Infantry Brigade – 45th Landwehr Infantry Division – X Army Corps
Established: 1889: Garrison: Rzeszów
Nationalities: 97 % Polish – 3 % other
Landwehr Recruiting District: Rzeszów
Commanding Officer: Colonel Edmund Lober Edler von Karstenrod
Staff officers: Lieut. Colonel Moritz Löwenstein - Major Karl Nikodem - Major Karl Kunzek - Major Josef Sittenberger                                                                                                                                                                                            
 18th Imperial-Royal Landwehr Infantry Regiment (Przemyśl)
89th Landwehr Infantry Brigade – 45th Landwehr Infantry Division – X Army Corps
Established: 1889: Garrison: Przemyśl
Nationalities: 47 % Ruthenian – 43 % Polish – 10 % other
Landwehr Recruiting District: Przemyśl and Sanok
Commanding Officer: Colonel Eduard Bezdiczka
Staff officers: Colonel Robert Pluhard von Ulogponte - Lieut. Colonel Franz Kraliček - Lieut. Colonel Karl Lindinger - Major Hugo Reichel - Major Ignaz Pick - Major Viktore Jarosz

 19th Imperial-Royal Landwehr Infantry Regiment (Lemberg)
85th Landwehr Infantry Brigade – 43rd Infantry Division – XI Army Corps
Established: 1889: Garrison: Lemberg
Nationalities: 59 % Ruthenian – 31 % Polish – 10 % other
Landwehr Recruiting District: Lemberg and Brzezany
Commanding Officer: Colonel Karl Jent
Staff officers: Lieut. Colonel Johann Opletal - Lieut. Colonel Franz Springinsfeld - Major Rudolf Thom - Major Alexander Süss - Major Franz Paulik - Major Kajetan Amirowicz - Major Miecislaus Linde

 20th Imperial-Royal Landwehr Infantry Regiment (Stanislau)
85th Landwehr Infantry Brigade – 43rd Landwehr Infantry Division – XI Army Corps
Established: 1889: Garrison: Stanislau
Nationalities: 72 % Ruthenian – 28 % other
Landwehr Recruiting District: Stanislau, Brzezany and Czortków
Commanding Officer: Colonel Anton Kosel
Staff officers: Lieut. Colonel Adolf Flecker - Lieut. Colonel Josef Otter - Lieut. Colonel Emanuel Hohenauer - Major Maximilian Preier - Major Otto Schreyer

 21st Imperial-Royal Landwehr Infantry Regiment (Sankt Pölten)
87th Landwehr Infantry Brigade – 44th Landwehr Infantry Division – XIV Army Corps
Established: 1889: Garrison: Sankt Pölten
Nationalities: 98 % German – 2 % other
Landwehr Recruiting District: St. Pölten and Vienna B
Commanding Officer: Colonel Eduard Edler von Dietrich
Staff officers: Lieut. Colonel Josef Vizthum - Lieut. Colonel Heribert Marchesani - Major Franz Sax - Major Josef Koch - Major Johann Lentsch - Major Gottfried Koch - Major Johann Ritter von Wróblewski

 22nd Imperial-Royal Landwehr Infantry Regiment
86th Landwehr Infantry Brigade – 43rd Landwehr Infantry Division – III Army Corps
Established: 1889
Garrison: Czernowitz
Nationalities: 27 % Ruthenian – 54 % Romanian – 19 % other
Landwehr Recruiting District: Czernowitz and Kolomea
Commanding Officer: Colonel Alois Göttl

 23rd Imperial-Royal Landwehr Infantry Regiment 23
5th Mountain Infantry Brigade – 18th Infantry Division – XVI Army Corps
Established: 1893
Garrison: Zara
Nationalities: 82 % Serbian/Croatian – 18 % other
Landwehr Recruiting District: Sebenico
Commanding Officer: Colonel Alfred Plesskot

 24th Imperial-Royal Landwehr Infantry Regiment
25th Landwehr Infantry Brigade – 13th Landwehr Infantry Division – II Army Corps
Established: 1900
Garrison: Vienna
Nationalities: 97 % German – 3 % other
Landwehr Recruiting District: Vienna B and Znaim
Commanding Officer: Colonel Otto Richter

 25th Imperial-Royal Landwehr Infantry Regiment
26th Landwehr Infantry Brigade – 13th Landwehr Infantry Division – II Army Corps
Established: 1900
Garrison: Kremsier
Nationalities: 83 % Czech – 17 % other
Landwehr Recruiting District: Kremsier
Commanding Officer: Colonel Karl Mader

 26th Imperial-Royal Landwehr Infantry Regiment
43rd Landwehr Infantry Brigade – 22nd Landwehr Infantry Division – III Army Corps
Established: 1901
Garrison: Marburg
Nationalities: 77 % German – 23 % other
Landwehr Recruiting District: Marburg and Cilli
Commanding Officer: Colonel Wenzel Schönauer

 27th Imperial-Royal Landwehr Infantry Regiment
44th Landwehr Infantry Brigade – 23rd Landwehr Infantry Division – III Army Corps
Established: 1901
Garrison: Laibach
Nationalities: 86 % Slovene – 14 % other
Landwehr Recruiting District: Laibach and Triest
Commanding Officer: Colonel Karl Zahradniczek
The 27th Infantry belonged to the Imperial-Royal Mountain Corps. From 11 April 1917 it was retitled to the 2nd Imperial-Royal Mountain Rifle Regiment 
 Contrary to Landwehr dress regulations it wore uniform based on the pattern of the State Rifles with an edelweiss on the collar, but with a number 27 on the hunting horn on their caps instead of the Tyrolean eagle.

 28th Imperial-Royal Landwehr Infantry Regiment
42nd Landwehr Infantry Brigade – 21st Landwehr Infantry Division – VIII Army Corps
Established: 1899
Garrison: Pisek
Nationalities: 79 % Czech – 20 % German – 1 % other
Landwehr Recruiting District: Pisek, Neuhaus and Beneschau
Commanding Officer: Colonel Josef Fiedler

 29th Imperial-Royal Landwehr Infantry Regiment
42nd Landwehr Infantry Brigade – 21st Landwehr Infantry Division – XVII Army Corps
Established: 1899
Garrison: Budweis
Nationalities: 45 % Czech – 54 % German – 1 % other
Landwehr Recruiting District: Budweis and Pisek
Commanding Officer: Colonel Johann Wurja

 30th Imperial-Royal Landwehr Infantry Regiment
51st Landwehr Infantry Brigade – 26th Landwehr Infantry Division – IX Army Corps
Established: 1899
Garrison: Hohenmauth
Nationalities: 68 % Czech – 28 % German – 4 % other
Landwehr Recruiting District: Hohenmauth and Königgrätz
Commanding Officer: Colonel Rudolf Kasel

 31st Imperial-Royal Landwehr Infantry Regiment
91st Landwehr Infantry Brigade – 46th Landwehr Infantry Division – I Army Corps
Established: 1901
Garrison: Teschen
Nationalities: 33 % Czech – 37 % German – 27 % Polish – 1 % other
Landwehr Recruiting District: Teschen and Wadowice
Commanding Officer: Colonel Emil Maculan

 32nd Imperial-Royal Landwehr Infantry Regiment
91st Landwehr Infantry Brigade – 46th Landwehr Infantry Division – I Army Corps
Established: 1901
Garrison: Neusandez
Nationalities: 91 % Polish – 9 % other
Landwehr Recruiting District: Neusandez and Tarnów
Commanding Officer: Colonel Silvester Edler von Lucanović

 33rd Imperial-Royal Landwehr Infantry Regiment
89th Landwehr Infantry Brigade – 45th LandwehrInfantry Division – X Army Corps
Established: 1901
Garrison: Stryj
Nationalities: 73 % Ruthenian – 27 % other
Landwehr Recruiting District: Stryj and Sambor
Commanding Officer: Colonel Ludwig Hromatka

 34th Imperial-Royal Landwehr Infantry Regiment
90th Landwehr Infantry Brigade – 45th Landwehr Infantry Division – X Army Corps
Established: 1901
Garrison: Jaroslau
Nationalities: 75 % Polish – 25 % other
Landwehr Recruiting District: Jaroslau and Gródek Jagiellonski
Commanding Officer: Colonel Ferdinand Wlaschütz

 35th Imperial-Royal Landwehr Infantry Regiment
85th Landwehr Infantry Brigade – 43rd Landwehr Infantry Division – XI Army Corps
Established: 1898
Garrison: Zloczów
Nationalities: 68 % Ruthenian – 25 % Polish – 9 % other
Landwehr Recruiting District: Zloczów and Tarnopol
Commanding Officer: Colonel Alfred Regenermel

 36th Imperial-Royal Landwehr Infantry Regiment
86th Landwehr Infantry Brigade – 43rd Landwehr Infantry Division – III Army Corps
Established: 1899
Garrison: Kolomea
Nationalities: 70 % Ruthenian – 21 % Polish – 9 % other
Landwehr Recruiting District: Kolomea, Stanislau and Czortków
Commanding Officer: Colonel Adalbert Dobija

 37th Imperial-Royal Landwehr Infantry Regiment
4th Mountain Infantry Brigade – 18th Infantry Division – XVI Army Corps
Established: 1906
Garrison: Gravosa
Nationalities: 82 % Serbian/Croatian – 8 % other
Landwehr Recruiting District: Castelnuovo
Commanding Officer: Colonel Franz Grossmann

State rifle regiments 
From 1906 the state rifles became the Imperial-Royal Mountain Corps and were renamed the Kaiserschützen ("Emperor's Rifles") in 1917. They were given various titles depending on the period.

 1st Imperial-Royal State Rifle Regiment (Trient) (k.k. Landesschützen-Regiment „Trient“ Nr. I)
 2nd Imperial-Royal State Rifle Regiment (Bozen) (k.k. Landesschützen-Regiment „Bozen“ Nr. II)
 3rd Imperial-Royal State Rifle Regiment (Innichen) (k.k. Landesschützen-Regiment „Innichen“ Nr. III)

Dress 
Landwehr infantry wore the hat of the rifle corps (Jägertruppe) as their parade headdress: a matt black hat of waterproof felt. It consisted of the crown and brim adorned with a hatband of green cord, a hunting horn and a hackle or plume of black cock feathers. The hat cord was made of sheep's wool, had a button and, at each end, an acorn covered with green wool and braided at the ends. The two acorns were attached to the rear of the hat crown. The cord for officers was made of interwoven black and gold thread.

The crown was in the shape of an oval cone, with a slight dent at the top. The brim was flat in front and behind, but "snapped up" on both sides. The brim was edged with black, varnished calfskin.

On the left side of the crown, there was a rearward, tilted socket for attaching the hackle. The hat badge - of gold-coloured metal - was a hunting horn. The battalion number in nickel silver was set in the centre formed by the loop of the horn. The badge was fastened over the socket for the feathers so that the number was inclined at the same angle as the socket. The hackle was formed in the shape of a rooster's tail around a 1.5 mm thick piece of steel wire. The length of the hackle was 29 cm. The hackle was inserted into the socket on the hat such that the feathers were swept back in an arc.

On the march the Landwehr used the normal infantry field cap (Feldkappe).

The uniform jacket (Waffenrock) of the Landwehr infantry - for officers and men - was on average the same as that of the infantry. The other ranks jacket was made of pike grey (hechtgrau) cloth with epaulettes, shoulder trim, collar and cuffs of grass-green colour. The buttons for all regiments were white and marked with the battalion number.

The shirts worn by the Landwehr infantry were of the same colour as the jacket with grass-green gorget patches to indicate their arm of service. Their remaining usual items of dress were no different from those of the line infantry.

Trousers were of pike grey cloth and cut long in accordance with the regulations for German regiments. The trousers of the officers had grass-green lampasses; NCOs and other ranks had grass-green piping along the side seam.

Dress variations for 4th and 27th Infantry
The uniforms of the 4th and 27th Infantry were an exception to the Landwehr infantry regulations; instead, they had the same dress pattern as the State Rifles.

The parade hat was no different from that of the Landwehr infantry and, in marching order, they used the infantry field cap. One special feature was a small, forward-sloping pocket on the left side of the cap into which a spray of black grouse feathers was fixed. On individual hats the feathers could be fixed directly to the cap in order that the white feathers could be displayed to best effect.

The uniform jacket of the two regiments was, like the State Rifles jackets - both for officers and men - cut in two rows unlike the infantry and had two rows each of eight silver buttons. The buttons bore the regimental number in Arabic numerals. The soldiers' jackets were made of pike grey material and had grass-green epaulettes, shoulder bars, collars and cuffs. On the collars there was a matt white edelweiss on each side, behind the rank badge (Distinktionsabzeichen).

The rifleman's shirt was the same colour as his jacket; the arm of service being signified by grass-green gorgets (Parolis). There were also other differences in the uniform compared with that of the infantry units of the Imperial and Royal Army.

The trousers were the same pattern as those of the Landwehr infantry.

See also: Imperial-Royal Mountain Troops

Cavalry

Mounted State Rifles 

 Imperial-Royal Mounted Tyrolean State Rifle Division (k.k. Reitende Tiroler Landesschützen Division)
1st Landwehr Cavalry Brigade (Wels) – 44th Landwehr Infantry Division
Allocated as liaison cavalry:
1st Squadron to 88th Landwehr Infantry Brigade – 44th Landwehr Infantry Division
2nd Squadron to 21st Landsturm Infantry Regiment – 108th Landsturm Infantry Brigade – 11th Honvéd Cavalry Division
3rd Squadron to 88th Landwehr Infantry Brigade – 44th Landwehr Infantry Division
Nationalities: 58 % German – 38 % Tyrol-Italians – 4 % Other
Established: 1872
Garrison: Trento
Recruiting District: Innsbruck and Prague
Commanding Officer: Lieutenant Colonel Moritz Graf von Srnka
 Imperial-Royal Mounted Dalmatian State Rifle Division (k.k. Reitende Dalmatiner Landesschützen Division)
Allocated as liaison cavalry:
1 troop, 1 Sqn, to 4th Mountain Brigade – 18th Infantry Division
1 troop, 1 Sqn, to 2nd Mountain Brigade
1 troop, 1 Sqn, to 14th Mountain Brigade – 47th Infantry Division
1 troop, 2 Sqn, to 5th Mountain Brigade  – 18th Infantry Division
1 troop to 18th Infantry Division
2 troops to 40th Honved Infantry Division
Nationalities: 82 % Serb/Croat – 18 % other
Established: 1874
Garrison: Sinj
Commanding Officer: Lieutenant Colonel Julius Stöger-Steiner

Museum coverage 

The history of Austro-Hungarian forces is documented in detail in the Military History Museum in Vienna, which was founded by Emperor Franz Joseph I as the Imperial-Royal Court Armaments Museum (k.k. Hofwaffenmuseum). In a special display cabinet in Hall V (the Franz Joseph Hall) of the museum, several uniforms of the Imperial Royal Landwehr are displayed, a relief on the rear of the cabinet shows the territories from which the Hungarian Honvéd and Imperial-Royal Landwehr recruited.

References and footnotes

Literature 
 Heinz von Lichem: Spielhahnstoß und Edelweiß – die Friedens- und Kriegsgeschichte der Tiroler Hochgebirgstruppe „Die Kaiserschützen“ von ihren Anfängen bis 1918. Leopold Stocker Verlag, Graz, 1977. .
 Heinz von Lichem: Der Tiroler Hochgebirgskrieg 1915–1918. Steiger Verlag, Berwang (Tyrol), 1985. .
 Anton Graf Bossi Fedregotti: Kaiserjäger – Ruhm und Ende: nach dem Kriegstagebuch des Oberst von Cordier. Stocker Verlag, Graz, 1977. .
 Carl Freiherr von Bardolff: Soldat im alten Österreich – Erinnerungen aus meinem Leben. Diederichs Verlag, Jena, 1938.
 Johann Christoph Allmayer-Beck, Erich Lessing: Die K.(u.)K. Armee 1848–1918. Bertelsmann Verlag, Munich, 1974.
 Oskar Brüch, Günter Dirrheimer: Das k. u. k. Heer 1895 (= Schriften des Heeresgeschichtlichen Museums in Wien (Militärwissenschaftliches Institut), Band 10),  Stocker Verlag, Graz, 1997. .
 Rest, Ortner, Ilmig: Des Kaisers Rock im 1. Weltkrieg – Uniformierung und Ausrüstung der österreichisch-ungarischen Armee von 1914 bis 1918. Verlag Militaria, Vienna, 2002. .
 Andreas Danner, Martin Prieschl, Johannes Heubel, Für Gott, Kaiser und Oberösterreich - das k.k. Landwehrinfanterieregiment Linz Nro. 2, in: 50 Jahre Wiedererrichtung Garnison Ried - Tapfer, standhaft und treu, Ried im Innkreis 2008, pp. 142 – 144;
 Thomas Reichl: Die österreichische Landwehr 1809, in: Viribus Unitis. Jahresbericht des Heeresgeschichtlichen Museums 2009, Vienna, 2009, 
 k.u.k. Kriegsministerium: Dislokation und Einteilung des k.u.k. Heeres, der k.u.k. Kriegsmarine, der k.k. Landwehr und der k.u. Landwehr in: Seidel's kleines Armeeschema, Hrsg. Seidel & Sohn, Vienna, 1914
 k.u.k. Kriegsministerium: Adjustierungsvorschrift für das k.u.k. Heer, die k.k. Landwehr, die k.u. Landwehr, die verbundenen Einrichtungen und das Korps der Militärbeamten, Vienna, 1911/1912

External links 

 http://www.mlorenz.at/

Austro-Hungarian Army